Ali Nizar Hamam (born 25 August 1986) is a Lebanese professional footballer who plays as a right-back for  club Nejmeh, whom he captains.

Starting his career at Taqadom Anqoun, Hamam moved to Ahli Saida in 2006, helping them reach promotion to the Lebanese Premier League. In 2008 he joined Nejmeh, where he won the league twice, the Super Cup once and the Elite Cup once. After six seasons at the club, Hamam moved to Iran at Zob Ahan, where he won the Hazfi Cup twice, and the Super Cup once. He returned to Nejmeh in 2018, winning the Elite Cup in his first season.

Hamam represented the Lebanon national team between 2009 and 2019; he has been capped 56 times, scoring three goals. Hamam was part of the team that played in the 2019 AFC Asian Cup, Lebanon's first participation through regular qualification.

Club career

Hamam started his career with Taqadom Anqoun, before joining Ahli Saida in 2006, who had just gained promotion to the Lebanese Premier League. After finishing in seventh place in 2006–07, his team finished in last place in the 2007–08 season, and was relegated back to the Second Division. Hamam, however, remained in the top-flight, moving to Nejmeh.

He played for Nejmeh from 2008 to 2014 season, winning the league twice, once in the first season and another in his last season, as well as one Lebanese Super Cup and one Lebanese Elite Cup, both in 2014.

In 2014, he transferred to Iran to play for Zob Ahan for an estimated price of around €200,000. He won the Hazfi Cup twice, in 2014–15 and 2015–16, and the Iranian Super Cup in 2016. He played 80 league matches, scoring four times for the Iranian club. In 2020, Hamam was voted best right-back of the 2016 AFC Champions League.

Four years later, in 2018, he returned to Nejmeh. He won the Lebanese Elite Cup in 2018.

International career

In December 2018, Hamam was called up for the 2019 AFC Asian Cup. On 16 October 2019, Hamam announced his retirement from international football, with three goals in 56 matches.

Style of play 
Hamam's main qualities are his experience on the field and his defensive abilities, as well as his attacking threat.

Career statistics

Club

International

Scores and results list Lebanon's goal tally first, score column indicates score after each Hamam goal.

Honours 
Nejmeh
 Lebanese Premier League: 2008–09, 2013–14
 Lebanese FA Cup: 2021–22; runner-up: 2020–21
 Lebanese Elite Cup: 2018, 2021
 Lebanese Super Cup: 2009; runner-up: 2021

Zob Ahan
 Iranian Hazfi Cup: 2014–15, 2015–16
 Iranian Super Cup: 2016

Individual
 IFFHS All-time Lebanon Men's Dream Team
 Fans' Asian Champions League XI: 2016
 Lebanese Premier League Team of the Season: 2008–09, 2011–12, 2012–13, 2013–14

See also
 List of Lebanon international footballers

References

External links

 
 Ali Hamam at RSSSF
 
 
 
 

Lebanese footballers
Lebanon international footballers
Association football fullbacks
1986 births
Living people
People from Sidon District
Lebanese expatriate footballers
Expatriate footballers in Iran
Lebanese expatriate sportspeople in Iran
Lebanese Premier League players
Persian Gulf Pro League players
Nejmeh SC players
Zob Ahan Esfahan F.C. players
2019 AFC Asian Cup players